Eupithecia rosalia is a moth in the family Geometridae. It is found in the regions of Araucania (Malleco Province) and Los Lagos (Valdivia and Osorno provinces) in Chile. The habitat consists of the Northern Valdivian Forest and Valdivian Forest biotic provinces.

The length of the forewings is about 8.5–10 mm for males and 9 mm for females. The forewings are brown, with grey and blackish brown scales and faint orange-brown scales along the cubital vein and on the veins in the outer portion of the wing. The hindwings are greyish white, with irregular brown scaling distally and along the anal margin, sometimes forming incomplete cross lines. Adults have been recorded on wing from November to February.

References

Moths described in 1882
rosalia
Moths of South America
Endemic fauna of Chile